Yann Joseph Richard Danis (born June 21, 1981) is a Canadian former professional ice hockey goaltender who played in the National Hockey League (NHL) for the Montreal Canadiens, New York Islanders, Edmonton Oilers, and New Jersey Devils. He played in the butterfly style of goaltending.

Early life
Danis was born to Yves Danis and Ginette Boucher in Saint-Jérôme, Quebec. He is the couple's only child. Danis graduated from École Secondaire St-Joseph in Saint-Hyacinthe, a Francophone high school, in 1999. He did not start playing hockey until age seven because he was afraid of getting bodychecked. After being reassured by his parents that he would not get hit in minor hockey, however, Danis began playing as a forward at the age of seven. When he was eight, he told his parents that he wanted to switch to goaltender because, he said, "I liked the big goalie pads, and I thought having a catching glove was cool." His parents subsequently bought him the goaltending equipment for Christmas.

Danis played in the 1995 Quebec International Pee-Wee Hockey Tournament with the Sélects-du-Nord minor ice hockey team. After playing for Cap Jeunesse in 1995–96 and Polyvalente of St. Jérôme from 1996–1998, Danis was named to the Quebec Junior AAA Hockey League's seventeen-year-old all-star team in 1998–99. He then played with the Cornwall Colts of the Central Junior A Hockey League (CJHL) in 1999–2000. He led the league in goals against average during the regular season, and he was named to the Academic All-Star Team and the Rookie All-Star Team. The Colts finished first in the regular season standings, and they won the Bogart Cup (presented to the CJHL champion) as Danis posted the lowest goals against average of any CJHL goalie in the playoffs. His team competed at the Fred Page Cup (presented to the Eastern Canadian Junior "A" Champions) before the Colts finally finished in fourth place overall in Canada Junior "A" Hockey tournament.

Playing career

College
Danis was first noticed by Brown University during the 1999 QJAAAHL All-Star Game. Following his year with Cornwall, he chose to attend Brown so he could focus on education along with his hockey career. In attending Brown, he became the first member of his family to attend a university. He started his career with the Brown Bears backing up Brian Eklund in goal. He took over for Eklund in the middle of the season, however, and he went 2–8–1 with a 3.60 GAA and an .888 save percentage in 12 games in a four-win season for Brown. Following the year, he was named a co-recipient of the Kevin R. Pope Memorial Trophy, presented annually by Brown University to the freshman who contributes most to the success of the team. The following year, Danis went 11–10–2 in 24 games. His 1.86 GAA and .938 save percentage (second in the nation) both set Brown single-season records, and his three shutouts (ninth in the nation) tied Brown's single season record. Brown made the playoffs that year, but they were swept by Harvard University in the first round. Danis did gain attention in the final game of the series, though, when he made 66 saves in a 2–1 defeat. Following the season, he was named Brown's most valuable player, and he became Brown's first All-American since 1992. He was also named to the ECAC All-Academic team and the New England Hockey Writers Association (NEHWA) All-Star team, and he was named Academic All-Ivy.

Danis posted a 15–14–5 record in 2003, and his .929 save percentage and his 2.31 GAA were second and eighth in the nation, respectively. He set Brown records for shutouts in a season (five, third in the nation), shutouts in a career (eight), and saves in a season (1,043). He became the fourth two-time Brown MVP winner, and he was again selected to the NEHWA All-Star team. He was selected to the All-Academic team again, and he was again named an All-American. His performance helped Brown advance for the first time since 1994 to the ECAC Final Four. In 2003–04, Danis posted a 15–11–4 record along with a 1.81 GAA and .942 save percentage that ranked third and second in the nation, respectively. Brown made it to the ECAC quarterfinals, but they were again eliminated by Harvard. However, Danis won multiple awards once again, including First Team Jofa All-American honors, All-United States College Hockey Online (USCHO) First Team honors, NEHWA All-Star honors, and First Team All-ECAC and First Team All-Ivy honors. In addition, he was named the 2004 ECAC Player and Goaltender of the Year, the USCHO Defensive Player of the Year, and the Ivy League Player of the Year. He also took home the Leonard Fowle Award as the MVP of New England, as voted on by the NEHWA, and he became the first Brown finalist for the Hobey Baker Award. During the season, Danis set ECAC records for single-season save percentage and career shutouts (13), and he tied Kevin McCabe for the most career wins by a Bears goaltender with 43. He also graduated from Brown with a degree in Public and Private Sector Economics.

Professional

The Washington Capitals and the Montreal Canadiens both showed interest in Danis following his junior year in college, but he chose to remain with Brown for his senior year. Following his college career, the Canadiens were still interested in him, and he signed with them on March 19, 2004. Upon signing, he was assigned to the Hamilton Bulldogs of the American Hockey League, where he backed up Jean-François Damphousse. He started two games for Hamilton and won both of them, and he also appeared in a playoff game in relief of Damphousse.

In 2004–05, Danis became the starting goalie for the Bulldogs, as Damphousse signed with the Quebec Radio X of the Ligue Nord-Américaine de Hockey. In 53 regular season games, he had 28 wins, 17 losses, six ties, five shutouts, a 2.34 GAA, and a .924 save percentage. The Bulldogs made the playoffs that year, but they were swept in the first round by the Rochester Americans, as Danis lost all four games of the series.

Danis was the starting goalie again for the Bulldogs in 2004–05, but he was also called up by the Canadiens several times. He played in six games with Montreal in 2005–06. On October 12, 2005, Danis earned a shutout against the Atlanta Thrashers in his first NHL game.

On July 2, 2008, he signed as an unrestricted free agent with the New York Islanders. After one season in the Islanders organization, he signed with the New Jersey Devils as an unrestricted free agent on July 10, 2009.

On July 27, 2010, Danis signed with Amur Khabarovsk of the Kontinental Hockey League. The following year, he signed a one-year contract with the Edmonton Oilers of the NHL. He signed a one-year contract to remain with the Oilers on July 1, 2012. After that contract expired, Danis signed a one-year, two-way contract with the Philadelphia Flyers.

In the 2014–15 season, Danis belatedly signed as a free agent to a try-out contract with the Norfolk Admirals on November 10, 2014. After 11 games with the Admirals he was released from his try-out and signed with fellow AHL club the Hartford Wolf Pack.

On July 3, 2015, Danis returned to the New Jersey Devils organization as a free agent, signing a one-year, two-way contract. On March 14, 2016, Danis made his first NHL appearance since March 10, 2013, coming in relief of Keith Kinkaid, allowing one goal in a 7–1 loss to the Anaheim Ducks.

On October 18, 2016, Danis signed an AHL contract with the St. John's IceCaps of the Montreal Canadiens organization.

He officially announced his retirement on February 11, 2018.

Personal life
Danis has a wife, Kyla, who is originally from Barbados, and two sons, Jayden and Ryder. They currently reside in Edmond, Oklahoma.

Career statistics

Regular season and playoffs

Awards and honours

References

External links
 

1981 births
Living people
Adirondack Phantoms players
Albany Devils players
Amur Khabarovsk players
Bridgeport Sound Tigers players
Brown Bears men's ice hockey players
Canadian ice hockey goaltenders
Edmonton Oilers players
Hamilton Bulldogs (AHL) players
Hartford Wolf Pack players
Ice hockey people from Quebec
Montreal Canadiens players
New York Islanders players
New Jersey Devils players
Norfolk Admirals players
Oklahoma City Barons players
People from Saint-Jérôme
St. John's IceCaps players
Undrafted National Hockey League players
Canadian expatriate ice hockey players in Russia
AHCA Division I men's ice hockey All-Americans